The enzyme chondroitin AC lyase catalyzes the chemical reaction

Eliminative degradation of polysaccharides containing 1,4-β-D-hexosaminyl and 1,3-β-D-glucuronosyl linkages to disaccharides containing 4-deoxy-β-D-gluc-4-enuronosyl groups

This enzyme belongs to the family of lyases, specifically those carbon-oxygen lyases acting on polysaccharides.  The systematic name of this enzyme class is chondroitin AC lyase. Other names in common use include chondroitinase (ambiguous), chondroitin sulfate lyase, chondroitin AC eliminase, chondroitin AC lyase, chondroitinase AC, and ChnAC.

Structural studies

References

 
 
 
 

EC 4.2.2
Enzymes of known structure